Na'il Diggs (born July 8, 1978) is a former American football linebacker. He was drafted by the Green Bay Packers in the fourth round of the 2000 NFL Draft. He played college football at Ohio State. Diggs has also played for the Carolina Panthers, St. Louis Rams, and San Diego Chargers.

College career
Diggs played college football at the Ohio State University. He spent his last two years at strongside linebacker after beginning college career as a defensive end. As a senior Diggs led the Buckeyes with 94 tackles, 15 tackles for losses and 6 sacks. In all he played in 37 games recording 202 tackles, 18 sacks, four forced fumbles, three fumble recoveries and one interception. He graduated with a degree in aviation.

Professional career

Pre-draft
Diggs measured 6'3½" and 231 pounds and had a 40-yard dash time of 4.55 seconds.

Green Bay Packers

Diggs was drafted by the Green Bay Packers in the fourth round of the 2000 NFL Draft. On June 20, 2000, Diggs signed a three-year $1.2 million contract that included a $300,000 signing bonus. On September 11, 2000, Diggs was named Sports Illustrated's Special Teams Player of the Week by Peter King. Diggs played in 13 games with 12 starts at strongside linebacker and was named All-Rookie by the PFWA after posting 54 tackles, one fumble recovery and four passes defensed. In 2001, he started all 16 games at strongside linebacker and produced 92 tackles, 2.0 sacks, and six passes defensed. In 2002 Diggs again started all 16 games at strongside linebacker and finished second on the team with 111 tackles, 3.0 sacks, one forced fumble, two fumble recoveries, two interceptions and seven passes defensed. Diggs was named NFC Defensive Player of the Month for December 2002, after making 37 tackles, one forced fumble, one fumble recovery, one interception and two passes defensed in five games.

In the 2003 off-season Diggs signed a four-year, $10.5 million contract after the Packers matched an offer sheet for the same amount from the Detroit Lions. In 2003 Diggs moved to weakside linebacker from and started all 16 games and had 123 tackles, 1.0 sack, one forced fumble, two interceptions and eight passes defensed. An injury kept Diggs out of the final two games in 2004, snapping his consecutive games started streak at 74. Diggs did start 14 games at weakside linebacker had 116 tackles, 1.0 sack, two passes defensed and one blocked kick. In 2005 Diggs returned to strongside linebacker and appeared in nine games with six starts. Before he was injured he generated 45 tackles, one fumble recovery. On March 2, 2006, he was released by the Packers.

Carolina Panthers
On April 20, 2006, Diggs was signed by the Carolina Panthers to a one-year $627,000 contract. The Panthers viewed Diggs as a replacement for weakside Will Witherspoon who had left the Panthers to sign with the St. Louis Rams. In 2006 Diggs appeared in 15 games with 10 starts totaled 68 tackles, and three passes defensed.

On March 2, 2007, Diggs re-signed with the Panthers for another year (for $1.35 million) and for that season Diggs played in all 16 games with 10 starts and made 49 tackles, 3.5 sacks, one forced fumble and five passes defensed. On December 29, 2007, the Diggs accepted a three-year extension for $7 million ($2.7 million of it guaranteed). In 2008 Diggs started all 16 contests as the strongside linebacker and recorded 62 tackles, 1.0 sack, one interception, and two passes defensed. 2009 was Diggs's final season with the Panthers and he remained at strongside linebacker and played in 15 games with 11 starts  and recorded 42 total tackles and a forced fumble. On March 5, 2010, the Panthers released Diggs.

St. Louis Rams
The Rams signed Diggs on April 7, 2010, to a two-year contract. The terms have not been disclosed. In his career Diggs has been the primary starter for his team four seasons at weakside linebacker and six at strongside linebacker. Diggs earned the starting strongside linebacker job in the 2010 preseason and kept the job until he tore a pectoral muscle late in the season.

On August 29, 2011, he was released by the Rams.

San Diego Chargers
Diggs signed with the San Diego Chargers on September 3, 2011.

NFL career statistics

Regular season

References

External links
Carolina Panthers bio

1978 births
Living people
Players of American football from Arizona
Ohio State Buckeyes football players
American football outside linebackers
Green Bay Packers players
Carolina Panthers players
St. Louis Rams players
San Diego Chargers players
Susan Miller Dorsey High School alumni